Romain (also Romain-la-Roche) is a commune in the Doubs department in the Bourgogne-Franche-Comté region in eastern France.

Geography

The Crotot cave has large galleries and stalactites.

History
The commune was known as Romain-la-Roche until 1918.

Population

See also
 Communes of the Doubs department

References

External links

 Romain on the regional Web site 

Communes of Doubs